Piletocera micralis is a moth in the family Crambidae. It was described by George Hampson in 1907. It is found on Borneo.

References

micralis
Moths described in 1907
Taxa named by George Hampson
Moths of Borneo